Medallia is an American customer and employee experience management company based in San Francisco, California, with offices in Buenos Aires, London, Tel Aviv, Munich, Paris, New York City, Washington DC, Austin and Sydney.

Medallia provides software-as-a-service (SaaS) customer experience management (CEM) and employee experience management (employee engagement) software to hospitality, retail, financial services, high-tech, and business-to-business (B2B) companies internationally.

Overview
As part of a customer experience management (CX or employee engagement) program, Medallia's cloud-based customer experience (CX) software platform captures voice of the customer feedback across Web, social, mobile, and contact center channels, analyzes it in real-time, and provides action workflows to executive, central and front-line teams for customer satisfaction, customer loyalty, Net Promoter scores and overall business performance.

Medallia provides a platform for social, text, video, speech, messaging and online feedback. The software analyzes feedback from Facebook, Twitter, and other major review sites (e.g., TripAdvisor) alongside solicited feedback data from surveys and contact centers. In addition to social media feedback and analysis, as well as mobile feedback and engagement, capabilities of the company's product include survey creation and management, text analytics and dashboarding, and direct goals and action management.

History
Founded in 2001, Medallia's founders, Borge Hald and Amy Pressman, were motivated to start the company after consulting to executives of Fortune 500 companies about consumer-company relationships. In 2017, the company was ranked #7 on the Forbes Cloud 100 list. Kampyle was acquired by Medallia in October 2016. In July 2019, Medallia went public on the NYSE.

In April 2020, Medallia acquired voice-to-text specialist Voci Technologies for $59 million.

In October 2021, Thoma Bravo completed acquisition of Medallia in an all cash transaction valued at $6.4 billion.

See also 
 Customer experience (CX)
 Customer feedback management services

References

Further reading

External links 
 

Software companies based in the San Francisco Bay Area
Companies based in San Francisco
2001 establishments in California
American companies established in 2001
Software companies established in 2001
Customer relationship management software companies
Cloud computing providers
Human resource management software
2019 initial public offerings
Companies formerly listed on the New York Stock Exchange
Software companies of the United States
2021 mergers and acquisitions
Private equity portfolio companies